Audrey Lees may refer to:

 Audrey Lees (architect)
 Audrey Lees (politician)